Cambridge railway station is the principal station serving the city of Cambridge in the east of England. It is the northern terminus of the West Anglia Main Line,  down the line from London Liverpool Street, the southern terminus.

The station is managed by Greater Anglia. Cambridge is noted for having the third-longest platform on the network in England.

It is the thirteenth busiest station in the UK outside London.

History

Up to 1923
In 1822, the first survey for a railway line in the Cambridge area was made and, in the 1820s and 1830s, a number of other surveys were undertaken none of which came to fruition although the Northern and Eastern Railway had opened up a line as far as Bishop's Stortford by May 1842. The financial climate in the early 1840s ensured that no further scheme got off the ground but, by 1843, Parliament had passed an act enabling the Northern and Eastern Railway to extend the line to Newport (Essex). The following year, a further act was passed, extending the rights to build a railway through to Cambridge itself. In 1844, the Northern and Eastern Railway was leased by the Eastern Counties Railway (ECR), which built the extension.

Robert Stephenson was appointed engineer and, on 29 July 1845, the station opened with services operating from Bishopsgate station in London via Stratford and Bishops Stortford.

In the years following the opening of the main line from Cambridge through to Norwich in 1845, other railways were built to Cambridge.  Initially, some of these planned to have separate stations but opposition from the university saw them all eventually using the same station. The first line to arrive was the St Ives to  line which opened in 1847 and was built by the East Anglian Railway. Services to  also commenced that year, with the opening of the line from  via  to Peterborough, which also became the main route for coal traffic into East Anglia which was built by the Eastern Counties Railway.

The following year, the Eastern Counties Railway opened a line between St Ives and March which saw some passenger services although the coal traffic (mentioned above) was then diverted on to this route.

In 1851, a branch line from Newmarket to Cambridge (Coldham Lane Junction) was opened which partly used the alignment of the Newmarket and Chesterford Railway which subsequently closed.

Although Cambridge was its goal, Parliament sanctioned only an extension as far as Shepreth (as the Eastern Counties Railway had opposed the extension to Cambridge). The line was completed in 1851 and initially the GNR, who had leased the Royston and Hitchin Railway in the interim, ran a connecting horse-drawn omnibus service. This proved unsuccessful, so in April 1852 the line was extended to join the ECR main line south of Cambridge and was leased to the Eastern Counties Railway for 14 years with a connection to enable the ECR to run trains from Cambridge to Hitchin.

In 1862, the Bedford and Cambridge Railway opened.

By the 1860s, the railways in East Anglia were in financial trouble and most were leased to the ECR; they wished to amalgamate formally, but could not obtain government agreement for this until 1862, when the Great Eastern Railway was formed by amalgamation. Thus Cambridge became a GER station in 1862.

The University of Cambridge helped block later 19th-century attempts to create a central station.

The GER opened the cross-country line from Marks Tey via Sudbury and Haverhill to Shelford in 1865, which enabled the introduction of direct services to Colchester.

The Midland Railway built a line from Kettering to Huntingdon which opened in 1866 and services ran to Cambridge using running powers over the Huntingdon to St Ives line. In 1866 the Great Northern Railway (GNR) again applied to run services from King's Cross as the lease on the line to Hitchin was ending. Initially the GER opposed this but eventually agreement was reached and, from 1 April 1866, services started operating between Cambridge and King's Cross from a dedicated platform at Cambridge station.

In 1882, the Great Northern and Great Eastern Joint Railway was opened. As well as becoming the major route for coal traffic from the north east to East Anglia it saw the introduction of direct services between London, Cambridge and York. Goods trains generally passed Cambridge on dedicated goods lines to the east of the station. Between these and the station a number of carriage sidings existed.

The next line to open was in 1884 when the Fordham line opened joining the main line towards Ely at Barnwell Junction. The following year the branch to Mildenhall railway station opened and services operated direct from there to Cambridge.

Each of the four companies also had its own goods facilities in the station area and, except for the M.R., its own motive power depot. The G.E.R. maintained a special locomotive for the Royal Train here for workings between London and Sandringham.

LNER 1923-1947
In the 1923 Grouping, the GER amalgamated with other railways to form the London and North Eastern Railway (LNER) and Cambridge became a LNER station. The Midland and LNWR similarly amalgamated with other railways to form the London, Midland and Scottish Railway (LMS).

In around 1928, the London and North Eastern Railway re-signalled the station replacing its five signal boxes with two electrically controlled boxes, with the work carried out by the British Power Railway Signal Company.

British Railways 1948-1996
Following nationalisation of the UK's railways, Cambridge station was operated by the Eastern Region of British Railways.

East Anglia was one of the first areas in the UK where British Railways wanted to phase out steam operation in favour of diesel traction. From 1959, diesels started to take over operation of services with Cambridge engine shed closing to steam in 1962. Diesel shunters and DMUs were allocated to another shed on the opposite side of the line known as Coldham Lane.

The 1960s saw a series of closures and a number of the lines serving Cambridge were closed at this time.

First to go was the lightly used line to Mildenhall, closed to passengers on 18 June 1962.

The Stour Valley Railway route to  via Haverhill and Sudbury closed on 6 March 1967 although the Sudbury-Marks Tey section remains operational as a branch line. The Varsity Line to Oxford also saw passenger services to Bedford withdrawn during this year (on 30 December 1967) as did the line between March and St Ives.

Passenger services along the Cambridge & St. Ives Branch managed to survive the Beeching Axe, but with British Rail citing heavy losses the final passenger service ran between St Ives and Cambridge on 5 October 1970. Despite campaigns to reopen the service during the 1970s, the only subsequent rail traffic on the line was a freight service to Chivers in Histon which ran until 1983 and a contract to ferry sand from ARC at Fen Drayton which continued until May 1992.

The privatisation era 1994 - present

Operations
The 1993 railways act came into force on 1 April 1994. Train Operating Units initially operated the services whilst the franchises were let.

A number of different train operating companies (TOCs) have operated services at Cambridge station since privatization. West Anglia Great Northern which was initially owned by Prism Rail but then bought by National Express, operated the West Anglia Great Northern franchise from January 1997 until March 2004. This covered services to both London Liverpool and King's Cross stations as well as King's Lynn. In April 2004 the Liverpool Street route became part of National Express East Anglia (NXEA) franchise whilst the Great Northern route to King's Cross remained part of WAGN until March 2006 when it became part of the First Capital Connect franchise.

Services to Ipswich and Norwich were initially operated by Anglia Railways from January 1997 and these routes later became part of the NXEA franchise.

Services to and from the Midlands were operated by Central Trains from March 1997.

In November 2007, the Central Trains franchise was split up with services through Cambridge becoming part of the Arriva CrossCountry network.

The First Capital Connect franchise passed to Govia Thameslink Railway in September 2014.

Infrastructure
On 1 April 1994, Railtrack became responsible for the maintenance of the national rail infrastructure.

Railtrack was succeeded by Network Rail in 2002, following financial difficulties.

The "CB1" area in front of the station buildings had been due for redevelopment by Ashwell Property Group. In December 2009 the developers went bankrupt and reformed under the name Brookgate. Part of the redevelopment scheme had included a £1 million contribution towards the Cambridgeshire Guided Busway scheme passing through the area.

A new island platform was brought into operational use in December 2011.

In 2012, the station infrastructure was under scrutiny as it emerged passengers were forced to queue for over 40 minutes to purchase tickets.

2016 Improvements
In 2014, the station operator Abellio Greater Anglia released plans to improve the station building at Cambridge as part of the CB1 project in the area. The works include a bigger concourse, more ticket gates and machines and a bigger ticket office. These opened in January 2017.

Building and platforms 

The station building, with its long classical façade and porte-cochère (infilled during the 20th century), has been attributed to both Sancton Wood and Francis Thompson and is listed Grade II. The long platform (platforms 1 and 4) is typical of its period but was unusual in that (apart from a brief period in the mid-19th century) it was not supplemented by another through platform until platforms 7 and 8 were added in 2011. Two further platforms (9 and 10) are proposed to the east of the station to accommodate additional planned services. There were major platform lengthenings and remodellings of the main building in 1863 and 1908. The station layout was altered in 1896 by deviating the Newmarket line approaches.

This platform is divided into Platforms 1 and 4 with a scissors crossover in the middle to divide it in two, which allows trains from either direction to pass those already stopped there. Bay platforms exist at both ends of the station: Platforms 2 and 3 at the southern end of the station and Platforms 5 and 6 at the northern end. Platforms 7 and 8 are located on an island platform on the eastern side of the station. These came into use in December 2011.

Platform 1 is a 12-car bi-directional through platform generally used for northbound services to Ely, King's Lynn and Cambridge North. It is also used for some southbound services to London King’s Cross and Stansted Airport and for some late evening terminating services.

Platforms 2 (10-car) and 3 (8-car) are south-facing bay platforms generally used for stopping services to and from London King's Cross. 

Platform 4 is a bi-directional 12-car through platform generally used for northbound services to Ely, Norwich, King's Lynn and Birmingham New Street. It is also used for some early morning southbound services to Stansted Airport and for some terminating late evening services.

Platforms 5 and 6 are 6-car north-facing bay platforms generally used for services to and from Ipswich and Norwich (and occasional services to and from Birmingham New Street).

Platforms 7 and 8 are bi-directional 12-car through platforms generally used for southbound services to London King's Cross, London Liverpool Street, Stansted Airport and Brighton via London St Pancras International. These platforms are also used for longer terminating trains from London Liverpool Street and London King's Cross.

Services

Services up to 1923
 Great Eastern Railway
 Main line from London Liverpool Street to Norwich and King's Lynn
 Cross-country services to  via Newmarket and to 
 Cross-country services via Ely,  and the Great Northern and Great Eastern Joint Line to northern England
 Branch line to St Ives and beyond
 Branch line to Mildenhall
 Great Northern Railway
 Services to London King's Cross via Hitchin, including the Cambridge Buffet Car Expresses
 London and North Western Railway
 Cross-country "Varsity Line" to Oxford
 Midland Railway
 Services via St Ives to

Present day services 

Cambridge is served by several operators.

CrossCountry 
This is operated using Class 170 diesel multiple units. There is typically an hourly service in each direction which commences at Cambridge. Three services a day extend to Stansted Airport.

Great Northern 
Great Northern serves the station as part of its service from London King's Cross, operating Class 387 and Class 700 electric multiple units.

 The "Cambridge Cruiser" (termed 'Cambridge Express' from London) runs non-stop between London King's Cross and Cambridge. There is a half-hourly service in each direction.
Off-peak these trains run non-stop between Cambridge and King's Cross; during peak hours additional stops are usually made. Some of these additional stops were phased out in First Capital Connect's May 2009 'Seats for You' timetable, since in some cases extra trains now run to call at the stops removed, such as Royston and Letchworth Garden City. A certain number of services to/from Cambridge start or terminate at Ely or King's Lynn.
 In total there are 4 Great Northern trains per hour each way between Cambridge and London King's Cross.

Thameslink 

Greater Anglia 
Greater Anglia serves the station with three routes:
To London Liverpool Street via the West Anglia Main Line. These services use Class 720 EMUs. There are typically two services each hour, one stopping and one semi-fast. A few services to/from Cambridge end or start at Bishops Stortford.
An hourly service between Cambridge and  via the Breckland Line. This uses Class 755 units and usually departs from Platform 5. This service was started in 2002 by Anglia, which ordered four Class 170s for use on the new service. Some services are extended to Stansted Airport
This uses Class 755s Bi-mode multiple units. These services usually depart from Platform 6.

Summary

Future services

East West Rail

A new East West Rail is being developed allowing travel from Oxford to Cambridge and onto Norwich and Felixstowe without needing to go via London, which has not been possible since the Varsity line was closed in the 60s. The western section between Oxford and Bedford has already been given the go-ahead and partly built. The central section from Bedford to Cambridge is more difficult as parts of the Varsity route have been built on, for example by the guided busway. The government has committed £10 million of funding as part of the 2016 Autumn Statement to continue to develop the route.

Transport links

Local and regional bus services 
Several local bus services by Stagecoach in Cambridge and Whippet Coaches stop immediately south-west of the main station building. There are 9 stops linking the railway with the city centre and other parts of Cambridge, including Addenbrooke's Hospital, and the surrounding area. The southern section of the Cambridgeshire Guided Busway connects directly to the station, allowing buses to run from Trumpington via the station to St. Ives and Huntingdon. Buses also travel from the station out of the city to Sawston and Saffron Walden. A taxi rank is located just outside the main entrance.

Cambridge Cycle Point 
Since February 2016, a 3-story cycle parking facility, with up to 2,850 spaces, has been open, named Cambridge Cycle Point. It is located in a building just to the north of the main station entrance. The ground floor of Cycle Point has a cycle shop.

Accidents

On 30 May 2015 the 09:14 GTR Great Northern service from London King's Cross failed to stop when entering a platform and collided at low speed with the stationary train it was due to couple with shortly after 10:00 BST. No damage was caused but three passengers were slightly injured.

Motive Power Depots

Main Shed

The Eastern Counties Railway opened a small motive power depot at the station in 1845. This was replaced by a larger depot on the west side of the line at the north end of the station, in 1847 and this shed became a Great Eastern Railway shed in 1862. The shed was enlarged in 1913.

Cambridge was the principal shed of a main GE district and during World War 1 was recorded as having 101 drivers, 89 firemen under an inspector named G Dorrington. Repairs fell under a foreman fitter who had a staff of 70 men although responsibility for boiler repairs fell to the foreman boilermaker. There was also a wagon repair facility at the depot at this time led by a leading carpenter. Finally another foreman was charged with the day-to-day running of the depot as well as being responsible for the outstations such as King's Lynn, Ely, Mildenhall and seven others. A number of clerks would also have been employed at the depot.

At the end of 1922 the Great Eastern shed at Cambridge had an allocation of 178 locomotives being the second biggest shed on the Great Eastern after Stratford shed. The allocation consisted of:

Further enlargement and improvement of facilities took place in 1932. Most significantly a mechanical coaling plant was bought into use as well as the construction of a new lifting shop and modern sand dispensers.

Cambridge shed had two locomotives allocated for royal train workings at this time - Class D15 4-4-0s numbers 8783 and 8787 (known as the Royal Clauds) which were kept in pristine condition.

Following nationalization in 1948 the shed was operated by British Railways Eastern Region. It was allocated shed code 31A at this time.

In the 1950s there was a dedicated pool of four drivers (known as the Royal Link) based at Cambridge who operated the two royal engines which were cleaned regularly. The locomotives were Class B2 4-6-0s numbers 61671 ‘Royal Sovereign’ and 61617 ‘Ford Castle’. The link system - which was operated throughout British Railways at this time was a career progression and at Cambridge these included Pilot Links (shunting), Branch Goods, Mainline Goods, Branch Passenger and Express links as well as route specific links to Bletchley, the GN (Hitchin) and Kettering routes.

Cambridge shed received its first allocation of diesels in 1958. The following year the last 2-4-0 locomotive in traffic on British Railways (Class E4 2-4-0 number 62785) was withdrawn from traffic and has been preserved in its GER guise of no 490 as part of the national collection. In 2018 it was on loan to Bressingham steam museum near Diss.

The shed closed 18 June 1962 and the demolition of Cambridge's loco shed building, repair shops and loco hoists leaving the shed offices and stores buildings took place in 1965. Some of the track in the former loco yard next to platform 6 was kept as engine sidings, while the rest was made into a car park.

Other sheds
The Great Eastern Railway opened a small motive power depot on the east side of the line at the south end of the station for its own and Great Northern Railway locomotives in 1879.

At the end of 1922 the Great Northern shed at Cambridge had an allocation of ten locomotives. The allocation consisted of:

This was closed by the London and North Eastern Railway in 1924, and used as a wagon works until it was demolished in 1985. The Bedfordshire and Cambridge Railway opened a small motive power depot on the west side of the line at the south end of the station in 1862. This was closed by the London Midland and Scottish Railway on 2 December 1935, but remained in use, unofficially until 1951. The building was demolished in 1964.

References

Bibliography

Further reading

External links 

Railway station
Railway station
Railway stations in Cambridgeshire
Grade II listed buildings in Cambridge
Grade II listed railway stations
Former Great Eastern Railway stations
Railway stations in Great Britain opened in 1845
Railway stations served by CrossCountry
Railway stations served by Govia Thameslink Railway
Greater Anglia franchise railway stations
Train driver depots in England
1845 establishments in England
East West Rail
DfT Category B stations